Northwestern Bell Telephone Company served the states of the upper Midwest opposite the Southwestern Bell area, including Iowa, Minnesota, South Dakota, North Dakota, and Nebraska.

History

Early beginnings 

It has never been definitively established where Northwestern Bell's earliest roots lie.  The earliest record of telephones in the Northwestern Bell service area was a two-telephone intercom circuit used by a Little Falls, Minnesota druggist and his clerk in 1876.  A Bell-licensed exchange is believed to have opened in Deadwood, South Dakota between March and August 1878, just two years after Alexander Graham Bell invented the telephone, and several months before President Rutherford B. Hayes could use his phone in a little wooden booth outside of his office in the White House.

The earliest documented telephone exchange in Northwestern Bell territory was opened by the Western Union Company in Keokuk, Iowa, on September 1, 1878. Using superior equipment designed by Thomas Edison and Elisha Gray, Western Union was in a competitive shoot-out with local licensee of the National Bell Telephone Company in Boston. On November 10, 1879, Western Union settled a Bell patent infringement suit by getting completely out of the phone business and selling all of its exchanges, including the Keokuk exchange, to the Bell Company.

In the fall of 1878, the Northwestern Telephone Company opened an "experimental" exchange in Minneapolis-located in City Hall, it served the city government as well as the Nicollet Hotel and Pillsbury Mills*. This exchange was the forerunner of the Bell-licensed Northwestern Telephone Exchange Company which was incorporated on December 10, 1878.

When the Northwestern Telephone Exchange Company was organized, it had authorized capital stock of $10,000.

On July 11th 1939, Northwestern Bell Telephone established dial service in Fargo, North Dakota.

Building Northwestern Bell

Telephone companies in the Northwestern Bell Group included the Tri-State Telephone Company, the Dakota Central Telephone Company, the Iowa Telephone Company, the Nebraska Telephone Company and the Northwestern Telephone Exchange.

Casper E. Yost served as the president of all the companies. It was a confusing arrangement to regulators, employees and even to the parent company, AT&T. In a letter to AT&T, Yost explained that when he was answering a question, making a proposal or discussing a problem in his correspondence with AT&T, he would use the letterhead of the particular company to which the question, problem or proposal related. One problem with this arrangement, especially for local telephone staffers and historians, is that the carbons of Yost's letters contain no letterheads.

Things became less confusing when the Tri-State and Dakota Central companies were folded into the Northwestern Telephone Exchange Company. In 1909, a single general office staff for the Iowa, Nebraska and Exchange companies was established in Omaha.

On December 10, 1920, Iowa Telephone changed its name to Northwestern Bell Telephone Company. In January, 1921, the Nebraska and Northwestern Telephone Exchange companies were merged into the new company. While the new company was incorporated in Iowa, its headquarters remained in Omaha.

Sale of telephone lines
In 1976, Northwestern Bell sold access lines in the Midland, Philip, Martin, White River, Milesville, and Hayes exchanges to Golden West Telephone, a small telephone cooperative in South Dakota.

Headquarters
The Northwestern Bell headquarters, now the AT&T Building (owned by CenturyLink), was located at 118 South 19th Street in Omaha, Nebraska.

Name usage
The Northwestern Bell name is still licensed for use today on telephone equipment produced by Unical Enterprises; otherwise, the NWBT name has disappeared. Dex Media white pages lists a customer service number under the Northwestern Bell name (which connects to Qwest). Additionally, the NorthWesternBell.com domain is still active and rolls over to the CenturyLink webpage.

References

Bell System
Lumen Technologies
Economy of the Midwestern United States
Defunct telecommunications companies of the United States 
American companies established in 1896
Telecommunications companies established in 1896
Communications in Nebraska
Communications in Iowa
Communications in Minnesota
Communications in South Dakota
Communications in North Dakota
American companies disestablished in 1991
Telecommunications companies disestablished in 1991